Županovice refers to the following places in the Czech Republic:

 Županovice (Jindřichův Hradec District)
 Županovice (Příbram District)